The 2011 India–Pakistan border skirmish was a series of incidents which took place during the months of July and August 2011 across the Line of Control in Kupwara District and Neelam Valley. Both countries gave different accounts of the incident, each accusing the other of initiating the hostilities.

Incident

Indian version 
India sources claimed that Pakistani Border Action Team (BAT) attacked a remote Indian Army post located at Gugaldhar ridge, Kupwara district on 30 July 2011. The post was manned by soldiers of the 19 Rajput Regiment and 20 Kumaon Regiment, the latter in the process of replacing the former. Around 6 Indian soldiers were killed in the attack. During the attack, the Pakistani forces beheaded two soldiers of the 20 Kumaon and took back the heads with them. A soldier of the 19 Rajput succumbed to his injuries in the hospital. A few days later, Indian army also discovered a video clip of the severed heads from a Pakistani militant who was killed while crossing into Jammu and Kashmir.

In retaliation, Operation Ginger was planned by the Indian Army which a plan to conduct an ambush on the Pakistan Army post of Police Chowki using multiple teams. Seven, physical and aerial, reconnaissance missions were conducted and three Pakistani Army posts were identified as vulnerable. These posts included Police Chowki, a post at Jor, Hifazat and Lashdat lodging point. The Para commandos crossed over the LoC at 10pm on 29 August and reached their targets at 3am on 30 August, a day before Eid. The first team of commandos laid claymore mines preparing for an ambush and targeting four Pakistani soldiers, including a JCO, at 7am. One of the Pakistani soldiers was injured and fell into a stream while the other three soldiers were beheaded by the Indian commandos. Indian soldiers booby trapped the dead bodies with IEDs. Two Pakistani soldiers from the post rushed towards the ambush site after hearing the explosions but were killed by a second team of Indian soldiers. Two other Pakistani soldiers attacked the second team but were killed by a third team of Indian soldiers. At 7.45am, the Indian soldiers started to head back to the LoC. As they were retreating, they saw another group of Pakistani soldiers heading towards the ambush site. They heard loud explosions which indicated that the IEDs had been triggered and estimated that two to three additional Pakistani soldiers had been killed in the blast. The last team reached back on the Indian side by 2.30pm on 30 August. During exfiltration, an Indian soldier blew his finger off when he accidentally fell on a mine. The Indian team carried back with them three severed heads, three AK47 rifles and other weapons as trophies. Initially the heads were photographed and buried but, later, one of the senior generals in the Indian Army, asked them to burn the heads and throw away the ashes so as to leave no DNA evidence. Indians claimed that during the 45-minute operation, at least eight Pakistani soldiers were killed and a further 2 to 3 Pakistani soldiers may have been fatally injured.

Officially, Indian Army spokesman maintained that the incident started when Pakistan made an infiltration bid in the Keran Sector of Kupwara District, Jammu and Kashmir on 30 August which was foiled by Indian security forces. During this an Indian Army JCO was also killed. He further claimed that there were two unprovoked firing incidents By the Pakistani Army, One on 31 August at around 8pm and another on 1 September at around 11am.

Pakistani version 
Pakistan claimed that the fighting started when Indian forces opened fire on a Pakistani checkpoint based on the Line of Control in the Neelam Valley of Azad Kashmir. The Pakistan Army spokesperson dubbed the attack as unprovoked and said that three soldiers of the paramilitary Mujahid Battalion were killed. He further claimed that the soldiers came under fire when they were moving from one post to another.

See also
 2013 India–Pakistan border skirmishes
 2014 India–Pakistan border skirmishes

References

Further reading
 Vijaita Singh, Josy Joseph,  Operation Ginger: Tit-for-tat across the Line of Control, The Hindu, 9 October 2016.
  Operation Ginger: What you need to know, The Hindu, 9 October 2016.
 Operation Ginger: Indian Army's surgical strikes in 2011 killed eight Pakistani soldiers, FirstPost, 9 October 2016.
 Ankit Panda, Operation Ginger: When Indian Forces Crossed the Line of Control in 2011, The Diplomat, 10 October 2016.

2011, India-Pakistan border skirmish
2011, India-Pakistan border skirmish
2011 in India
2011 in Pakistan
Conflicts in 2011
Border shooting
Manmohan Singh administration
Military history of India
Military history of Pakistan
Government of Yousaf Raza Gillani
Wars involving India
Wars involving Pakistan
August 2011 events in Pakistan
September 2011 events in Pakistan
August 2011 events in India
September 2011 events in India
2010s in Jammu and Kashmir
Battles in 2011